The German Central Agency for German Schools Abroad (ZfA) is an agency of the Federal Office of Administration, itself an agency of the Federal Ministry of the Interior, that operates and manages schools for German children outside of Germany. The ZfA supports over 1,200 schools worldwide, including more than 140 German schools abroad, and approximately 1,100 schools in the respective educational system in which the German Language Certificate (DSD) can be acquired.

Schools that are a part of the ZfA network primarily serve children of expatriates working at embassies or consulates, for offices of German multinational companies, and/or who live in major centers of economic and/or political operations. Many also serve communities with ties to other German-speaking countries, such as Austria and Switzerland. Schools in some locations emphasize ties to Germany and/or Germanness, while others emphasize international connections and education and promote their instruction of the German language. Nowadays, three out of four pupils of German schools abroad are from the respective host countries or other cultures. In North America many schools emphasize ties to Germany, with some offering Saturday-only programmes.

See also
 Agency for French Education Abroad (AEFE) – The French equivalent
 Deutsches Sprachdiplom Stufe I and II

References
 Moore, Fiona. "The German School in London, UK: Fostering the Next Generation of National Cosmopolitans?" (Chapter 4). In: Coles, Anne and Anne-Meike Fechter. Gender and Family Among Transnational Professionals (Routledge International Studies of Women and Place). Routledge, 6 August 2012. , 9781134156207.

Notes

External links
 German Schools Abroad / Deutsche Auslandsschulen - German Missions in the United States (German Embassy in Washington and its Consulates)
 German schools abroad – where children from different cultures meet - Federal Office of Administration - 2020/02/19
 The German Approach - Official website about German schools in the United States and Canada

German federal agencies